A lineage-bonded society is a type of acephalous society predicated on claims of a common ancestor.

A lineage-bonded society is by population, the smallest classification of acephalous society. Beyond a certain size threshold, claims of common lineage become untenable, and the social ties resulting from those claims destabilize. A lineage-bonded society that outgrows its limits may break apart into subgroups. Such branches would then either become separate lineage-bonded societies, or would merge with a neighboring society. When two lineage-bonded societies merge in such a way, the outcome is a land-bonded society

A lineage-bonded society may harbor a secret society or may be large enough to support age sets but can't sustain both secret societies and age sets, and cannot make the transition to statehood.

This society is similar to a band society.

See also
 Ethnic group
 Tribe
 Blood quantum laws
 Dawes Act
 Dawes Rolls

References
 Based on material presented by Joseph C. Dorsey at Purdue University

Anthropological categories of peoples